Yury Rogozov (Russian: Юрий Рогозов; born 8 September 1930) is a Russian rower who represented the Soviet Union. He competed at the 1952 Summer Olympics in Helsinki with the men's coxless four where they were eliminated in the semi-final repêchage.

References

External links
 

1930 births
Living people
Soviet male rowers
Olympic rowers of the Soviet Union
Rowers at the 1952 Summer Olympics
European Rowing Championships medalists